Max Holden may refer to:

 Max Holden (cricketer) (born 1997), English cricketer
 Max Holden (magician) (1884–1949), Scottish-born American vaudeville performer
 Max Holden (One Life to Live), a fictional character from the American soap opera One Life to Live